James Ryan Scott (born 30 August 2000) is a Scottish professional footballer who plays as a forward for EFL League One club Exeter City.

Club career

Motherwell
Scott made his senior debut for Motherwell on 21 April 2018, as a late substitute away to Ross County in the Scottish Premiership. He had already played for the club's under-20 team in the Scottish Challenge Cup, making his first appearances aged 15.

On 15 February 2019, he signed a new contract, keeping him at Motherwell until 2022. He started his first game on 24 February, in a 4–1 defeat against Celtic. During that match Scott failed to return the ball to the opposition after an injured player had received treatment, and instead took a shot that led to Motherwell's goal. On 27 April 2019, Scott scored his first senior goal in Motherwell's 4–3 win at home to Dundee.

By the end of January, Scott had scored six goals in 28 appearances for Motherwell during the 2019–20 season. Motherwell accepted an offer from Hull City for Scott on 31 January 2020.

Hull City
Scott signed a three-and-a-half year contract with Hull City on 31 January 2020, with the club also having the option of extending the contract by one year. During his first training session with Hull, Scott suffered an ankle injury that was expected to prevent him from playing for the rest of the 2019–20 season. 

He made his debut for Hull on 20 June 2020, against Charlton Athletic. On 27 June 2020, Scott scored his first goal for Hull City with a well placed header against Birmingham in a 3–3 draw.

Hibernian (loan)
On 20 August 2021, Scott returned to Scotland to join Hibernian on loan for the duration of the 2021–22 season. Scott made his debut for Hibernian two days later in a 2–2 draw with Dundee. On 15 May 2022, the final day of the Scottish Premiership campaign, Scott netted a hat trick in a 4–0 win over St Johnstone. He returned to Hull at the end of the season.

Exeter City
On 31 January 2023, Scott was released by Hull City after spending two-years at the club and making 36 appearances in all competitions for the Tigers. He was subsequently signed by Exeter City on an 18-month permanent contract, rejoining former Hibernian assistant manager Gary Caldwell.

International career
In August 2019, Scott was called into the Scotland under-21 squad, for the European under-21 Championship qualifiers against San Marino and Croatia, and he went on to make his debut as a substitute against San Marino.

Career statistics

Honours 
Hull City
 League One: 2020–21

References

2000 births
Living people
Footballers from Glasgow
Scottish footballers
Scotland under-21 international footballers
Association football forwards
Motherwell F.C. players
Hull City A.F.C. players
Hibernian F.C. players
Exeter City F.C. players
Scottish Professional Football League players
English Football League players